The Patiala Necklace was a necklace  designed & made by the Cartier S.A. in 1928. It was made for Bhupinder Singh of Patiala, who was the Maharaja of the princely state of Patiala.

The necklace had five chains (ladi) and included a neck collar.

The necklace contained 2,930 diamonds, including as its centrepiece the world's seventh-largest diamond at the time, the "De Beers". That diamond had a 428 carat pre-cut weigh, and it weighed 234.65 carats in its final setting. It is the largest cushion-cut yellow diamond and  the 2nd largest yellow faceted diamond in the world. The necklace also contained seven other large diamonds ranging from 18 to 73 carats, and a number of Burmese rubies.

The necklace went missing from the Royal Treasury of Patiala around 1948.

In 1982, at a Sotheby's auction in Geneva, the "De Beers" diamond reappeared. There, the bidding went up to $3.16 million, but it is unclear whether it met its reserve price.

In 1998, part of the necklace was found at a second-hand jewellery shop in London by Eric Nussbaum, a Cartier associate.{ |date=November 2021}} The remaining large jewels were missing, including the Burmese rubies and the 18 to 73 carat diamonds that were mounted on a pendant. Cartier purchased the incomplete necklace and, after four years, restored it to resemble the original. They replaced the lost diamonds with cubic zirconia and synthetic diamonds, and mounted a replica of the original "De Beers" diamond. They never planned to give it back to the family who it belonged to. 

The necklace is the subject of a documentary by Doc & Film International.

A granddaughter of Bhupinder Singh of Patiala is now a jeweller  in California. She was involved in an exhibit "Maharaja: The Splendor of India's Royal Courts" at the Asian Art Museum, where the recreated necklace was displayed.

Notes

Individual necklaces
Cartier